Acanthocalyx is a genus of about three species of plants in the family Caprifoliaceae, sometimes included in Morinaceae, native to Sino-Himalayan 
Region.

Species
Acanthocalyx alba ( Hand.-Mazz. ) M.J.Cannon
Acanthocalyx delavayi ( Franchet ) M.J.Cannon
Acanthocalyx nepalensis ( D.Don ) M.J.Cannon

References

Cannon MJ, Cannon JFM. 1984. A revision of the Morinaceae (Magnoliophyta-Dipsacales). vol. 12. Bull. Br. Mus. (Nat. Hist.) Bot., 35p.

Caprifoliaceae
Caprifoliaceae genera
Flora of China
Flora of West Himalaya
Flora of East Himalaya